Mark David Shelton (born 20 February 1959) is an Australian politician who is the current Speaker of the Tasmanian House of Assembly since June 2021, and previously served in the role from 2017 to 2018 He was previously the Minister for Police, Fire and Emergency Management and Minister for Local Government in the Hodgman Liberal Government, and is a member for Lyons.

Shelton was Mayor of Meander Valley from 2003. In 2010, he was endorsed as a Liberal candidate for Lyons at the state election of that year. He defeated Jane Howlett for the final Liberal seat. He was re-elected in 2014 and 2018 with increase primary vote each time. He was the second Liberal elected by 150 votes behind Guy Barnett.

References

1959 births
Living people
Speakers of the Tasmanian House of Assembly
Members of the Tasmanian House of Assembly
Liberal Party of Australia members of the Parliament of Tasmania
Mayors of places in Tasmania
21st-century Australian politicians